Hajj Qalandar or Hajqalandar may refer to:
 Hajj Qalandar, Kerman
 Hajj Qalandar, Kohgiluyeh and Boyer-Ahmad